This is a list of curling clubs in Poland:

Clubs
 City Curling Club, Warsaw
Karkonosze Curling Club, Piechowice
Media Curling Club, Warsaw
Warsaw Curling Club, Warsaw
Cracow Curling Club, Kraków
KS Spójnia, Warsaw
Silesian Curling Club, Katowice
KS EURO 6, Warsaw
Zielona Góra Curling Club, Zielona Góra
Sopot Curling Club Wa ku'ta, Sopot
AZS Łódź, Łódź
Klub Środowiskowy AZS Politechniki Śląskie, Gliwice
Toruński Klub Curlingowy, Toruń
Ruda Śląska Curlik Curling Club, Ruda Śląska
Gdański Curling Club, Gdańsk

See also 
 List of curling clubs

External links
 Polish Curling Association

Poland
Curling in Poland
Curling